In the 2011-12 season, Al Shorta competed in the 2011–12 Iraqi Elite League. Al Shorta managed to stay in the top four throughout most of the season but a run of 6 losses in a row led them to 7th place in the league.

Squad

Kit

Transfers

In

Out

Competitions

Iraqi Elite League

Matches

Classification

Basketball 
Al Shorta finished 4th in the 2012 Arab Club Basketball Championship.

References

External links 
 Al Shorta website
 Al Shorta TV
 Team info at goalzz.com

Al Shorta
Al-Shorta SC seasons

ar:نادي الشرطة العراقي
ca:Al-Shorta FC Bagdad
es:Al-Shorta
fr:Police Club (Bagdad)
it:Al-Shorta Football Club
nl:Al Shorta